Jana Novotná and Arantxa Sánchez Vicario won in the final 7–6, 6–2 against Sabine Appelmans and Miriam Oremans.

Seeds
Champion seeds are indicated in bold text while text in italics indicates the round in which those seeds were eliminated. The top two seeded teams received byes into the quarterfinals.

 Jana Novotná /  Arantxa Sánchez Vicario (champions)
 Lisa Raymond /  Rennae Stubbs (quarterfinals)
 Sabine Appelmans /  Miriam Oremans (final)
 Amy Frazier /  Kimberly Po (quarterfinals)

Draw

External links
 1996 Páginas Amarillas Open Doubles Draw

Doubles